The Aleppo Artillery School massacre was a massacre of Syrian Army cadets by members of the Muslim Brotherhood on 16 June 1979. It was part of the 1976–1982 Islamist uprising in Syria.

Massacre
The massacre occurred on 16 June 1979, in the Ramouseh district of the city of Aleppo, Syria, at the Aleppo Artillery School. An officer on duty, Ibrahim el-Youssef, and members of the Syrian Muslim Brotherhood calling themselves the Fighting Vanguard (at-Tali’a al-Muqatila) and led by ʿAdnan ʿUqla, massacred over 110 Alawi cadets in the Aleppo Artillery School. The duty officer in charge of the school called Alawite cadets to an urgent morning meeting in the mess hall of the school; when they arrived, he and his accomplices opened fire on the unarmed cadets with automatic weapons and grenades. The incident marked the beginning of full scale urban warfare of the Syrian Muslim Brotherhood against the ruling Alawites.

Reaction
On 22 June, the Syrian interior minister, Adnan al-Dabbagh, accused the Muslim Brotherhood of the massacre. Although the principal targets were members of the Alawite sect, the Syrian Minister of Information, Ahmad Iskander Ahmad, stated that the murdered cadets also included Christians and Sunni Muslims. In a statement distributed on 24 June, the Muslim Brotherhood organization denied that it had any prior knowledge of the massacre nor involvement in it. It also accused the Syrian government, then led by the Alawite President Hafez al-Assad, of trying to tarnish the image of the Muslim Brotherhood, speculatively because it was influential among the Syrian public. Overall, Syrian Islamists differed in their response to the massacre, however, with differing beliefs about the role of this kind of violence as a resistance tactic against the regime.

The Syrian government responded by sentencing to death an estimated 15 prisoners belonging to the "Islamic resistance movement," all of whom were also accused of being Iraqi agents. Following the massacre, terrorist attacks became almost a daily occurrence, particularly in Aleppo and other northern cities. The government usually attributed these attacks to the Muslim Brotherhood, but as the armed resistance gained wider popular support and other, loosely defined, armed groups appeared, it became difficult to determine the extent of the Brotherhood's involvement.

See also
 Siege of Aleppo (1980)

References

1979 mass shootings in Asia
1979 murders in Syria
Artillery School massacre
20th-century mass murder in Asia
Islamic terrorist incidents in the 1970s
Islamist uprising in Syria
June 1979 crimes
June 1979 events in Asia
Mass murder in 1979
Massacres in 1979
Artillery School massacre
Mass shootings in Syria
Massacres in Syria
School massacres in Asia
School shootings in Asia
Artillery School massacre
Terrorist incidents in Asia in 1979
Terrorist incidents in Syria in 1979
1979 in Islam